Mount Zero, also known as Mura Mura in the Jardwadjali language is the northernmost mountain of the Grampian range. Its prominent conical shape is visible from the Western Highway south of Horsham. Scottish explorer Sir Thomas Livingstone Mitchell named and then described the mountain as "Mount Zero, a name I applied to a remarkable cone at the western extermity of the chain of mountains." While the peak is inside the National Park, the Mount Zero Olive Farm runs along its northern approaches. Scrub covers the sandstone slopes, with a track running up to the summit from the Mt Zero Picnic Area.

Mount Zero will be the terminus of a new 144-km walking track starting at Dunkeld in the south.

See also
 List of mountains in Victoria

References

External links
Parks Victoria - Grampians National Park

William
Grampians (national park)